Diagnosis: Murder is a 1975 British film. It was directed by Sidney Hayers and co written by Ivan Goff.

Cast
Jon Finch - Inspector Lomax
Judy Geeson -  Helen
Christopher Lee - Dr. Hayward
Tony Beckley - Sergeant Greene
Dilys Hamlett - Julia Hayward
Jane Merrow - Mary Dawson
Colin Jeavons - Bob Dawson

References

External links
Diagnosis: Murder at IMDb

1975 films
Films directed by Sidney Hayers